is the sixth studio album by Japanese singer/songwriter Chisato Moritaka, released on March 25, 1992 by Warner Music Japan. The album was recorded at The Hit Factory in London. A limited edition release included a 32-page photo book.

The album reached No. 3 on Oricon's albums chart and sold over 314,000 copies. It was also certified Platinum by the RIAJ in April 1994.

Track listing

Personnel 
 Chisato Moritaka – vocals, guitar (9)
 Hideo Saitō – all instruments, programming, backing vocals (all tracks except where indicated)
 Yasuaki Maejima – keyboards, piano, programming (2, 7)
 Yuichi Takahashi – guitar, synthesizer, programming, backing vocals (4, 7, 13, 15)
 Hiromasa Ijichi – piano (4)
 Nobuo Kurata – piano (8, 14)
 Shin Kōno – Fender Rhodes, programming, (6, 10)
 Yukie Matsuo – keyboard (12)
 Yukio Seto – guitar, (4, 6, 10), Fender Rhodes (14)
 Hiroyoshi Matsuo – guitar, programming (7, 12, 13)
 Masafumi Yokoyama – bass, guitar, programming, backing vocals (4 13, 15)
 Kenji Takamizu – bass (14)
 Eiji Shimamura – drums (14)
 Seiji Matsuura – backing vocals (1)
 Gavyn Wright – strings (8, 14)
 Jeff Daly – alto flute (14)
 Ron Asprey – alto flute (14)
 Steve Sidwell – flugelhorn (14)

Charts

Certification

Cover versions 
 Sanae Johnouchi covered "Yowasete yo Kon'ya Dake" as her eighth single on August 25, 1993.

Video album 

The video album for Rock Alive was released on LaserDisc and VHS on June 25, 1992. Its contents were compiled in the 2000 DVD Chisato Moritaka DVD Collection No. 6: Kusai Mono ni wa Futa wo Shiro!!/Rock Alive.

Track listing

References

External links 
 
 
 

1992 albums
Chisato Moritaka albums
Japanese-language albums
Warner Music Japan albums